Trinchesia ornata is a species of sea slug, an aeolid nudibranch, a marine gastropod mollusc in the family Trinchesiidae.

Distribution
This species was described from Japan. It has been reported from the Echizen Coast, Fukui Prefecture, north-west coast of Honshu, Japan and Hong Kong, South Korea and  Peter the Great Bay, Russia

References 

 Baba, K. (1937). Opisthobranchia of Japan (II). Journal of the Department of Agriculture, Kyushu Imperial University. 5(7):289-344, pls. 1-2
 Liu J.Y. [Ruiyu] (ed.). (2008). Checklist of marine biota of China seas. China Science Press. 1267 pp.

External links
  Baba, K. (1961). Three new species of the genus Catriona from Japan (Nudibranchia-Eolidacea). Publications of the Seto Marine Biological Laboratory. 9(2): 367-372
  Burn, R. F. (2006). A checklist and bibliography of the Opisthobranchia (Mollusca: Gastropoda) of Victoria and the Bass Strait area, south-eastern Australia. Museum Victoria Science Reports. 10:1–42
  Cella, K; Carmona Barnosi, L.; Ekimova, I; Chichvarkhin, A; Schepetov, D; Gosliner, T. M. (2016). A radical solution: The phylogeny of the nudibranch family Fionidae. PLoS ONE. 11(12): e0167800

Trinchesiidae
Gastropods described in 1937